(meaning "Autumn leaves") is a fictional character from the Ninja Gaiden series of video games by Team Ninja and Tecmo (Koei Tecmo). She is a kunoichi shrine maiden and an apprentice and team mate of the series' protagonist Ryu Hayabusa, who was introduced as a supporting playable character in 2008's action game Ninja Gaiden: Dragon Sword. Momiji later returned in this role in Ninja Gaiden Sigma 2 (including their Plus ports for the PlayStation Vita) and Ninja Gaiden 3: Razor's Edge, and is also available in Dead or Alive 5 Ultimate/Last Round, Dead or Alive 6, Warriors Orochi 3 Hyper/Ultimate, and Dead or Alive Xtreme 3. In most of her appearances, Momiji is voiced by Yūko Minaguchi in Japanese and by Kate Higgins in English. Her character has been generally well received by the series' fans and game critics.

Appearances

Ninja Gaiden
Momiji was raised to be Hayabusa ninja clan's Dragon Shrine Maiden like her older sister Kureha who was Ryu's childhood friend. She is both a shinobi (ninja) and a miko (shamanistic shrine maiden) who was tasked with keeping the ancient relics passed down the Hayabusa village from the ancient Dragon Lineage and carrying out the Shrine Maiden's rites and rituals to purify the world of evil forces. Among the relics that the maidens were tasked with guarding is the Eye of the Dragon, a jewel said to contain the souls of the ancient Dragons. Kureha was killed when the village was attacked in 2004's Ninja Gaiden and the devastated Momiji began training under Ryu as a precaution, becoming a skilled kunoichi along with her shrine maiden duties and abilities. Since then she supports and follows her master whenever he comes around. Momiji is a very gentle and caring young woman who is seen as an older sister figure by all of the village's children, including the boy Sanji. Like her mentor Ryu Hayabusa, Momiji trains extensively to become one of the deadliest warriors in the Hayabusa village.

In Ninja Gaiden: Dragon Sword, Momiji is normally playable only in the game's first chapter, but it is possible to play her through the entire game after unlocking the special difficulty setting "The Way of Kunoichi", which becomes accessible if the player manages to win the unfair boss fight at the end Momiji's chapter. After her session of training with Ryu, Momiji stays behind to pick flowers for Kureha's grave where she is attacked by the Black Spider clan and eventually captured by the fiendish Red Dragon. She is interrogated by Black Spider's Obaba for the Eye of the Dragon but turns out she managed to fuse the jewel into her soul, preventing Obaba from killing her. The Fiends' leader Ishtaros plans to use the captive Momiji to lure Ryu and kill him. During the battle between Ryu and Ishtaros at the Gates of Hell, Ryu is overwhelmed by the Dark Dragonstones' power but the ghost of Kureha appears and draws out Momiji's soul. Together they release the Eye and imbue the Dragon Sword with its power, allowing it to become the True Dragon Sword that Ryu uses to defeat Ishtaros. Nicchae, the Greater Fiend of Destruction and Ishtaros's twin, appears and takes Momiji, Ishtaros' body and the eight Dark Dragonstones deeper into Hell in an attempt to reawaken the Vigoor Emperor. Nicchae's plan ends in failure as the Dark Dragon consumes the Emperor and Ishtaros before bursting forth to threaten the world once again. Ryu defeats the Dark Dragon with the True Dragon Sword, and Momiji is finally rescued. Afterwards, Momiji mourns Kureha alongside the children of the village and makes a vow at Kureha's grave to become stronger so she can defend herself and the village. She leaves Ryu a letter as she departs to train in her travels.

Momiji returns as a playable character in Ninja Gaiden Sigma 2. While Ryu is away at Tokyo, the Hayabusa village is invaded once again by the Black Spider clan. As Jo battles Genshin, Momji rallies the Hayabusa ninjas to protect the rest of the villagers. Ryu later returns to the village and repels the invasion, killing almost all the invading Black Spider ninjas. Momiji soon realizes that Sanji has been taken captive, prompting her to go rescue him. As she travels to Tokyo, she encounters one of the Tengu Brothers and soundly defeats him. This leads her to Sanji, who is being held prisoner by both brothers. After her victorious battle, she reassures Sanji that she will always look out for him until he becomes a master ninja. As they return home, they are unknowingly saved by Muramasa, who kills a Black Spider ninja who is about to shoot an arrow at them. Momiji is also featured in the spin-off title ZEN Pinball: Ninja Gaiden Sigma 2.

In Ninja Gaiden 3, after Sanji finds Ryu unconscious outside and brings him to Momiji, she watches over him and helps him recover. During his journey to find his father in the shrine, she assists him in dealing with the Grip of Murder curse while helping him defeat the Black Spider ninja clan. Whenever the curse almost takes complete control over Ryu, Momiji uses her power to protect his mind and help him regain his senses. As they get near to the shrine, they are attacked by Obaba, but they manage to defeat her. Near the end of the battle, Momiji is knocked unconscious by Obaba, but Ryu manages to save her and brings her to the shrine to be taken care of by his father. When Canna attacks Tokyo as the Goddess and Ryu begins to become overwhelmed by Fiends, Momiji and Jo arrive just in time to save him. She gives her master the Eye of the Dragon before he departs, leaving her and his father to fight off the surrounding foes.

Momiji became playable again in the NG3 update Ninja Gaiden 3: Razor's Edge. She makes an appearance in the spin-off game Yaiba: Ninja Gaiden Z, as an ally and love interest of Ryu, who is an antagonist in the game. She arrives to give the Eye of the Dragon to him, and then Ryu saves her from peril. Her card also appears in mobile game Ninja Gaiden Clans.

Other appearances
In the fighting games Dead or Alive 5 Ultimate and Dead or Alive 5 Last Round, Momiji joins the DOA tournament in order to put what she has learned to the test. She is one of the nine playable female characters in the DOA sport spin-off title Dead or Alive Xtreme 3. In September 2019, Momiji was added as a downloadable content character to Dead or Alive 6.

Momiji makes playable appearances in the Wii U edition of Warriors Orochi 3 (Warriors Orochi 3 Hyper), including in the game's duel mode, and later in Warriors Orochi 3 Ultimate. Previously she has made an unplayable guest appearance in the Warriors series in Dynasty Warriors: Strikeforce for the PlayStation 3, where she gives a series of quests to the player character who can earn the right to wield her "Heavenly Dragon" naginata in battle.

Design and promotion

The character was originally designed for Ninja Gaiden: Dragon Sword by Mariko Hirokane, whose work on the game was her professional debut (she also later worked as a concept artist for Dead or Alive 5). Dragon Sword producer and Ninja Gaiden Sigma 2 producer and director Yosuke Hayashi, who considers Momiji his "very own" character, stated his Sigma 2 design priorities as "How much sexier can a female ninja get?" He said she was the "definitively" the most difficult of the Sigma 2 heroes to create for this game: "Honestly, there were no clear answers to questions like what she would look like as high-res model, what sort of weapon she would use, and what her abilities were. All our staff had different ideas about her, but I think it came together well in the end, and we were able bring her personality to life." Hayashi also said he had originally rejected the idea of making Ayane (from Dead or Alive) and Momiji playable in the original version of Ninja Gaiden 3 as he wanted to focus on Ryu.

Momiji is a tall, young girl with amber eyes and long black hair tied in a ponytail. Her measurements are B92 / W58 / H88 and she is 21-years-old in DOAX3. Originally she wore a white Hayabusa ninja training outfit with greenish-black hair, but starting in Sigma 2 she has black hair. Momiji usually wears minimal armor for mobility. By Sigma 2, her main costume became a revealing battle-priestess outfit where the colors red and white represent dragon's flame and purification. Her alternative costumes in the game, "designed for action and style," include a variation of her shrine maiden costume that "mixes a skirt with a traditional ceremonial top," an "easy-to-move clothing for combat whose violet design still maintains a sense of serenity," and a "traditional clothing for those taking part in secular festivals" that is very similar to Kasumi's original costume in the early Dead or Alive games. Another costume was first made available as part of a paid DLC, and more arrived with Razor's Edge.

Her other wardrobe in Last Round include a red dress designed by Tamiki Wakaki, white costumes based on the characters of Princess Allura from Deception IV: The Nightmare Princess and the winged goddess Feena from Nihon Falcom's Ys Origin, a schoolgirl uniform of Sachiko Tanaka from Square Enix's School Girl Strikers, a schoolgirl-ninja costume of Homura from Senran Kagura, and the black leather outfit of Majo from Tatsunoko's Time Bokan (with blonde hair). Additional costumes for Momiji were included in pre-order bonuses for Sigma 2 and Razor's Edge. The "Momiji Red" version of Dead or Alive 5 Ultimate (DOA5U) Japan-only limited edition contains, among other things, Momiji-themed bonuses such as a 3D oppai mousepad and a bath poster. In Japan, first-print copies of Tecmo Koei's Musou Orochi 2 Ultimate (Warriors Orochi 3 Ultimate) were bundled with DLC codes for special Orochi-themed costume for Momiji in DO5U, and special edition of Yaiba: Ninja Gaiden Z included an exclusive Yaiba-themed DLC costume for Momiji in DOA5U that was later also carried over to Dead or Alive Extreme 3. Dead or Alive 5 Last Round pre-order bonuses included a beach party costume for Momiji from Best Buy.

Gameplay
In Sigma 2, besides her unlockable single-player chapter in the story mode, Momiji is also available for co-op multiplayer gameplay on 30 special missions, as well as additional Tag Mission and Ninja Race mode in Sigma 2 Plus. She is an acrobatic character with a unique double jump ability, and can attack enemies from the air. According to GameSpot, Momiji in Sigma 2 "plays similarly to Ryu and is just as fast and formidable with a blade. She's able to leap through the air, dash, slice, dice, and more, with similar physics to Ryu" and a similar control system. Between her, Ryu and Ayane, Momiji the slowest but strongest with her naginata, which has the best height and reach. According to 1UP.com, "Momiji's reach is her biggest advantage, and the Naginata deals insane damage to her enemies," allowing to "kill them quickly and efficiently" from a safe distance. A drawback to this is "her raw strength and long range are balanced by her slow mobility." GamesRadar called her "actually the middle-ground character. Wielding a naginata halberd, Momiji's combos require more skill, but she does have a number of one-hit kill techniques." Despite Momiji's use of bow and arrows, PC Magazine opined that a particular problem with Momiji in the game is that she has "no effective quick projectile," and so the players have "to rely on her jumping abilities and Ultimate Techniques to create some breathing room." Momiji's breasts in the game can be manipulated with the motion sensor of the Sixaxis controller.

In Ninja Gaiden 3: Razor's Edge, she was made simultaneously available in an update for the Wii U version and at launch for the PlayStation 3 and Xbox 360. She can be played in Chapter Challenge mode and Ninja Trials co-op mode. Her new skills include a long-range naginata attack. X360 judged all the "girls" of the game as "just as deadly" as Ryu. In Dead or Alive 5 Ultimate, Momiji is still an agile character, retaining her unique double jump move from the Ninja Gaiden series. Like Kasumi, Momiji is able to teleport, but her style is completely different with a relatively high learning curve. NowGamer reported that in DOA5U she has "a few aerial mix-ups and even a 360 air-throw for those who want a slightly more challenging character to master."

Reception
The character was mostly well received, in part due to her sex appeal. GameSpot's Luke Anderson wrote that in Ninja Gaiden Sigma 2 "Momiji certainly looks the part in a Tecmo game, and with that sort of getup, she's certain to send pulses racing." Commenting on her more detailed appearance in Sigma 2 in comparison to this in Dragon Sword, Michael McWhertor of Kotaku wrote that "all that smooth upper thigh rendered by the Cell processor" would be one of the main selling points of the game; PLAY later placed her Momiji Sigma 2 as third on their 2010 list of top "side-boobs" in games. Justin Towell of GamesRadar opined Momiji adds "some welcome variety to the hack 'n' slash gameplay" of Sigma 2 and stated a hope she would appear in Dead or Alive 5 "and our Sexy Fan Art gallery too." Prima Games called Momiji a Ninja Gaiden fan favorite and PSX Extreme compared her to Soulcalibur'''s Taki as similar in her figure and design. She was ranked as the 31st best looking game girl by GameHall's Portal PlayGame in 2014 and has been consistently voted the DOA series' eight most popular female character in Japan in the publisher Koei Tecmo's own polls in both 2014 and 2015. Dave Halverson from play wanted to see Ninja Gaiden "back to its action-platforming roots with Momiji as the lead." A popular fan-favourite, Momiji was also an often-requested character to be appear in Dead or Alive 6; in effect, the game's director and producer Yohei Shimbori said he has made his "personal effort" to include her.

NowGamer's Ryan King called Momiji "the most interesting addition" to Dead or Alive 5 Ultimate and GamesRadar's Mike Reparaz included her appearance in Dynasty Warriors: Strikeforce among the "awesome character cameos". Craig Harris of IGN praised the "great" way of how she was used in the tutorial chapter in Dragon Sword, and IGN's Ryan Clements wrote that the "beautiful Momiji...will add yet another layer of gameplay to Sigma 2 that elevates the experience beyond the 360 version;" the game's review by PLAY opined her stages, albeit short, "genuinely enhance Ninja Gaiden Sigma 2 Plus's core story." Speaking of different character and the change in gameplay it brings, SCEA's Jeff Rubenstein said, "personally, I was a fan of Momiji and her halberd weapon in NGS2." On the other hand, Gabriel Zamor of PC Magazine singled her out while writing about how "frustrating experience" using female characters can be for the players in the Ninja Gaiden series as it can force "a significant play-style change on them." IGN's Vince Ingenito singled out Momiji and Nyotengu as the best new characters of DOA5, writing: "Momiji's style, while certainly reminiscent of the many ninjas of the cast, adds enough flaming flourishes and impressive acrobatics to set her apart. Watching the two of them face off falls somewhere between late-night Hong Kong wire-fu and a live-action Avatar fan-fic, in the best possible way."

GamesRadar's Brett Elston opined she looks "a lot more family friendly" than the characters from the previous Ninja Gaiden games and EGM even declared the "unsexy newcomer" Momiji as "not read for Dead or Alive." Play similarly noted how "astonishingly" conservatively Momiji dressed in Dragon Sword, even as Earnest Cavalli of The Escapist later called her a "hilariously stereotypical" example of an "overtly sexualized Japanese woman." VideoGamer.com noted her for a "class and charm," and GameSpot's Kevin VanOrd wrote he "cringed" when he found a poem written by Ryu "in which he professes his adoration of Momiji and refers to his own manhood as a 'wee-wee'" in one of the toilet humour jokes in Ninja Gaiden Z.

Despite warnings from Team Ninja to not do it or no more Dead or Alive games will be released for the PC, modders quickly released a topless version of Momiji in Last Round. Furthermore, Momiji might have inspired an also naginata-wielding character of the same name featured in the video game For Honor''.

See also
Ninja in popular culture

References

External links
 
 Official profile (DOA6)

Dead or Alive (franchise) characters
Female characters in video games
Fictional blade and dart throwers
Fictional exorcists
Fictional female ninja
Fictional kyūjutsuka
Fictional miko
Fictional Japanese people in video games
Fictional martial artists in video games
Fictional jujutsuka
Fictional Ninjutsu practitioners
Fictional shamans
Fictional polearm and spearfighters
Fictional swordfighters in video games
Koei Tecmo protagonists
Ninja characters in video games
Ninja Gaiden characters
Religious worker characters in video games
Video game characters introduced in 2008
Video game characters who can move at superhuman speeds
Video game characters who can teleport
Video game characters who use magic
Video game sidekicks
Woman soldier and warrior characters in video games